Light flyweight, also known as junior flyweight or super strawweight, is a weight class in boxing.

Professional boxing
The weight limit at light flyweight in professional boxing is 108 pounds (49 kilograms). When New York legalized boxing in 1920, the law stipulated a "junior flyweight" class, with a weight limit of 99 pounds. When the National Boxing Association was formed in 1921, it also recognized this weight class. However, on January 19, 1922, the NBA decided to withdraw recognition of the junior flyweight division. On December 31, 1929, the New York State Athletic Commission also abolished the junior flyweight class. No champion had been crowned in this division prior to its abolition.

The World Boxing Council (WBC) decided to resurrect this division in the 1970s. The first champion in this division was Franco Udella, who won the WBC title in 1975. The World Boxing Association also crowned its first champion in 1975, when Jaime Rios defeated Rigoberto Marcano via fifteen-round decision. The first International Boxing Federation champion was Dodie Boy Penalosa, who won the belt in 1983.

The first light flyweight "superfight" took place on March 13, 1993, when Michael Carbajal, the IBF champion, knocked out WBC champion Humberto González to unify the championship. Their rematch, on February 19, 1994, was the first time a light flyweight fighter (Carbajal) made a million dollar purse.

Current world champions

Current The Ring world rankings

Keys:
 Current The Ring world champion

Amateur boxing
At the Summer Olympic Games, the division is defined as up to 49 kilograms.

Olympic champions

1968 – 
1972 – 
1976 – 
1980 – 
1984 – 
1988 – 
1992 – 
1996 – 
2000 – 
2004 – 
2008 – 
2012 – 
2016 –

European champions

1969 –  György Gedó (HUN)
1971 –  György Gedó (HUN)
1973 –  Vladislav Sasypko (URS)
1975 –  Aleksandr Tkachenko (URS)
1977 –  Henryk Średnicki (POL)
1979 –  Shamil Sabirov (URS)
1981 –  Ismail Mustafov (BUL)
1983 –  Ismail Mustafov (BUL)
1985 –  René Breitbarth (GDR)
1987 –  Nszan Munczian (URS)
1989 –  Ivailo Marinov (BUL)
1991 –  Ivailo Marinov (BUL)
1993 –  Daniel Petrov (BUL)
1996 –  Daniel Petrov (BUL)
1998 –  Sergey Kazakov (RUS)
2000 –  Valeriy Sydorenko (UKR)
2002 –  Sergey Kazakov (RUS)
2004 –  Sergey Kazakov (RUS)
2006 –  David Ayrapetyan (RUS)
2008 –  Hovhannes Danielyan (ARM)
2010 –  Paddy Barnes (IRL)
2011 –  Salman Alizade (AZE)
2013 –  David Ayrapetyan (RUS)

Pan American champions

1971 –  Rafael Carbonell (CUB)
1975 –  Jorge Hernández (CUB)
1979 –  Hector Ramírez (CUB)
1983 –  Rafael Ramos (PUR)
1987 –  Luis Román Rolón (PUR)
1991 –  Rogelio Marcelo (CUB)
1995 –  Edgar Velázquez (VEN)
1999 –  Maikro Romero (CUB)
2003 –  Yan Bartelemí Varela (CUB)
2007 –  Luis Yáñez (USA)
2011 –  Joselito Velazquez (MEX)

Notable light flyweights
Iván Calderon
Michael Carbajal
Jung-Koo Chang
Luis Estaba
Leo Gamez
Humberto Gonzalez
Yoko Gushiken
Louisa Hawton
Yuh Myung-woo
Donnie Nietes
Saman Sorjaturong
Román González
Ricardo Lopez

References

External links

Flyweight

sv:Viktklass